Natural Causes is a 1985 Australian television film about ex-hippies having a reunion.

References

External links
Natural Causes at Peter Malone website

Australian television films
1985 films
Films scored by Chris Neal (songwriter)
1980s English-language films